Charters Towers is a rural town in the Charters Towers Region, Queensland, Australia. During the last quarter of the 19th century, the town boomed as the rich gold deposits under the city were developed. After becoming uneconomical in the 20th century, profitable mining operations have commenced once again.

Geography and climate
The urban area of the town of Charters Towers includes its suburbs: Charters Towers City (the centre of the city); Richmond Hill, Toll, and Columbia to the north, Queenton to the east, Grand Secret and Alabama Hill to the west, and Towers Hill, Mosman Park, and Millchester to the south.

Charters Towers obtains its water supply from the nearby Burdekin River.

Charters Towers has a hot semi-arid climate (Köppen climate classification: BSh), with two distinct seasons. The short wet season from mid-November to March is hot and moderately rainy, while the long dry season from April to mid-November is warm and dry, with lower humidity.

History

The town was founded in the 1870s when gold was discovered by chance at Towers Hill on Christmas Eve 1871 by 12-year-old Aboriginal boy, Jupiter Mosman. Jupiter was with a small group of prospectors including Hugh Mosman, James Fraser, and George Clarke. Their horses bolted after a flash of lightning. While he was searching, Jupiter found both the horses and a nugget of gold in a creek at the base of Towers Hill. Charters originated from the Gold Commissioner, WSEM Charters. Ten major gold reefs were eventually mined.
Such were the boom years, between 1872 and 1899, that Charters Towers hosted its own stock exchange. The Great Northern Railway between Charters Towers and the coastal port of Townsville was completed in December 1882. During this period, the population was about 30,000, making Charters Towers Queensland's largest city outside of Brisbane. The city was also affectionately known as "The World", as anything one might desire reportedly could be had in the Towers, leaving no reason to travel elsewhere.

The Borough of Charters Towers was proclaimed on 21 June 1877 under the Municipal Institutions Act 1864 with John McDonald being elected the town's first mayor. The local government area would later be known as Town of Charters Towers and City of Charters Towers, before being absorbed into the Charters Towers Region.

Charters Towers Post Office opened on 17 May 1872.

A 20 head of stamps mill began ore-crushing operations on 16 July 1872.  The Venus Battery continued to be used by small mine in the region until 1971. The unique site remains intact today, together with a cyanide treatment plant and assay office.

On Sunday 10 August 1884, the new Charters Towers District Hospital opened. During 1888–89, the Charters Towers Stock Exchange and Royal Arcade were constructed at the northern end of Gill Street for local businessman and civic leader Alexander Malcolm.

By 1917, gold mining became uneconomical. During World War I, labour was hard to find, and as the mines drove deeper, ventilation and water problems arose. This production decline was similar across Australian gold mines, with rising costs and a fixed gold price eroding profitability. The town entered a long period of relative stagnation and little further development has occurred since.

The Charters Towers gold field produced over 200 tonnes (6.6 million troy ounces) of gold from 1871 to 1917. The gold is concentrated into veins, and was Australia's richest major field with an average grade of 34 grams per tonne. The grade was almost double that of Victorian mines and almost 75% higher than the grades of Western Australian (Kalgoorlie) gold fields of that time.

During World War II, Charters Towers was the location of RAAF No.9 Inland Aircraft Fuel Depot (IAFD), completed in 1942 and closed on 29 August 1944. Usually consisting of four tanks, 31 fuel depots were built across Australia for the storage and supply of aircraft fuel for the RAAF and the US Army Air Forces at a total cost of £900,000 ($1,800,000).
Beginning in June 1943, Charters Towers was also the location for a major USAAF chemical bomb depot operated by the 760th Chemical Depot Company (Aviation). The depot contained bombs filled with mustard agent, cyanogen chloride and other toxic chemicals. In addition to maintaining the depot, the 760th cooperated with the Australian Chemical Warfare Research Unit to conduct research on bomb design and delivery techniques. Late in 1944, the depot and its contents were moved to Oro Bay, New Guinea.

Heritage listings

Charters Towers has a number of heritage-listed sites, including:
 Anne Street: Church of Christ
 Bridge Street: Boer War Veterans Memorial Kiosk and Lissner Park
 Columbia, Toll: Bore Sight Range and Compass Swinging Platform
 25 Deane Street: Aldborough
 Enterprise Road, Queenton: Signals, Crane and Subway, Charters Towers Railway Station
 17 Gill Street: Charters Towers Post Office
 18 Gill Street: Pollard's Store (now K Hub) 
 34–36 Gill Street: Bank of New South Wales
 49 Gill Street: Charters Towers Police Station
 134 Gill Street: St Columba's Church Bell Tower
 157 Gill Street: Ambulance Building
 39 – 47 High Street: Charters Towers Central State School
 24 – 26 Hodgkinson Street: School of Mines
 28 Hodgkinson Street: Charters Towers Courthouse
 63 Hodgkinson Street: Ay Ot Lookout
 57 – 59 King Street, Richmond Hill: Thornburgh House
 MacDonald Street, Millchester: Venus State Battery
 Mosman Street: Bartlam's Store (now Zara Clark Museum)
 65 Mosman Street: ED Miles Mining Exchange
 72 Mosman Street: Queensland National Bank
 76 Mosman Street: Charters Towers Stock Exchange Arcade
 86 Mosman Street: Australian Bank of Commerce
 90 Mosman Street: Lyall's Jewellery Shop
 Paull Street: Day Dawn mine remains
 2–6 Paull Street: Pfeiffer House
 20 Ryan Street: Charters Towers Masonic Lodge
 36 Ryan Street: Civic Club
 Towers Hill: Mining works on Towers Hill

Some of Charters Towers's heritage is spread across the town:
 Alabama, Millchester, Queenton, Towers Hill: Charters Towers mine shafts
 Charters Towers City, Millchester, Queenton, Richmond Hill: Stone kerbing, channels and footbridges of Charters Towers

Population
According to the 2016 census, 8,120 people were residing in Charters Towers.
 Aboriginal and Torres Strait Islander people made up 10.9% of the population.
 About 83.3% of people were born in Australia. The next-most common countries of birth were New Zealand 1.5% and England 1.3%.
 About 87.6% of people spoke only English at home.
 The most common responses for religion were no religion 24.4%, Catholic 23.5%, and Anglican 18.0%.

Economy 
Charters Towers is a regional centre for the mining industry, the beef industry, and education, specifically boarding schools catering for remote rural families.

Mining
More gold has been estimated to exist underground than the total removed in the gold rush. Hundreds of separate mining leases covering an area of 200 km2 were consolidated by James Lynch in the 1970s and 1980s and the company Citigold listed on the Australian Securities Exchange in 1993. Gold is mined from two deposits, which are accessed by sloping tunnels. Citigold has announced plans to open three mines directly under the city to extract gold at a rate of 250,000 ounces per year.

Education
Charters Towers has four secondary schools: Columba Catholic College (opened in 1998); Blackheath and Thornburgh College (opened in 1919); All Souls St Gabriels School (opened in 1920); and Charters Towers State High School (opened in 1912). The nearest university is the James Cook University, in Townsville. Charters Towers is well known as a boarding school town, with families from western Queensland, the Northern Territory, Western Australia and the Torres Strait Islands sending their children to school in the district, over the larger cities in the area such as Townsville and Cairns. The Alliance of Charters Towers State Schools (ACTSS) represents the five State schools in the area that are funded by the Queensland Government – Charters Towers Central State School (opened in 1875), Millchester State School (opened in 1874), Richmond Hill State School (opened in 1895), Charters Towers School of Distance Education (opened in 1987) and Charters Towers State High School.

A number of other state schools within the city and nearby vicinity, which mostly commenced during the mining boom years, have also existed. These included Queenton State School (1890–1933), Mt. Leyshon State School (1890 – circa 1940), King's Gully State School (1911–1932), the Broughton State School (1905–?), Macrossan State School (1884–19??), Rishton State School (1884–1891), Liontown State School (1905 – circa 1921), Black Jack State School (1887–1948), Pumping Station State School (1898–1936), and Sellheim State School (1889–1939).

Amenities 
The Charters Towers Regional Council operates the Charters Towers Excelsior Library in Charters Towers at 130 Gill Street.

The Charters Towers branch of the Queensland Country Women's Association meets at the Jane Black Memorial Hall at 80 Mossman Street. Jane Black of Pajingo Station was a pioneer of the Charters Towers branch but also one of the founders of the Country Women's Association in Queensland as a whole. The hall was officially opened on Thursday 22 July 1954.

Media and communications

Print
The Northern Miner newspaper (not to be confused with The Northern Miner, a mining publication in Canada) was first published in August 1872, just eight months after the discovery of gold. Such was its strength in those gold-mining days of the late 1880s that The Northern Miner installed a then-revolutionary linotype slug-casting machine before Brisbane's The Courier Mail. It was the only newspaper (of five published during the boom gold years) that survives today. In 2000, The Northern Miner was linked for the first time to the North Queensland Newspaper Company and therefore News Limited's electronic layout system and website.

The Evening Telegraph was a daily newspaper published between 1901 and 1921.

Sumpton's Gold Rush Gazette is a local newspaper which has been printed weekly since April 2021. The publication's founder, Daniel Sumpton, has been referred to as "The man who brought Print Journalism back to Charters Towers."

Online
The Charters Towers E-Village launched in 2011 and provides a location where people can connect with the Charters Towers community. The E-Village is the creation of local resident, Bryan West, following his frustration at not being able to find a suitable date for a kindergarten working bee.  It includes a community calendar, member pages for all Charters Towers organisations, a database of services available within and to the community, classifieds, daily weather, and an online shop. It has a daily news service that originates and aggregates content from and relevant to the Charters Towers community, which is delivered through a Facebook page and free daily newsletter. Because it has a lower than national proportion of households with reliable internet access, the Charters Towers E-Village installed a free public wireless internet service in the main street of the town, in conjunction with local businesses. Since its inception in 2011, it has grown to receive about 1,500 visits each day. The E-village derives its income from related web services, with any profits being returned to the Charters Towers community.

Radio
Charters Towers is served by two local commercial radio stations, 4GC and West FM (originally branded as Hot FM), both owned by Resonate Broadcasting.  Both stations rely heavily on networked programming but 4GC, broadcasting on 828 AM, produces a local breakfast program between 6am and 9am each weekday and provides local news bulletins and weather updates.  Along with 3GG in Warragul, Victoria, Resonate Broadcasting bought the Charters Towers stations from Macquarie Media Group in 2008, with the three stations becoming the company's first investments.

The Bull FM88 is the only country music radio station in Charters Towers playing an extensive mix from the 1980s to today. It is a low-powered open narrowcast (LPON) service broadcasting on 88.0 FM, which began in 2018. It is owned and operated by Margflow Media.

Television
In 2021, Charters Towers was confirmed to have been selected as the location for the ninth season of Australian Survivor, a Survivor: Blood vs Water series scheduled to air on Network 10 in 2022 featuring a mix of former contestants and celebrities.

The Goldfield Ashes
The Charters Towers Goldfield Ashes has been an amateur cricket carnival conducted over the Australia Day long weekend in January since 1948 by the Charters Towers Cricket Association Incorporated (CTCA), and it is now the largest in the Southern Hemisphere. Players ranging from regional and the country to play. Numbers in recent years have reached just shy of 200 teams. The event is of massive benefit for the town, bringing in business for the entire region, especially the town's pubs and clubs. While the higher grades take it very seriously with awards and prizes given, the lower grades take to a more social view. Games involving drinking penalties and costume wearing are all part of the antics. In 2010, more teams were involved than ever.  However, the competition did not reach the magic 200 teams only because of the lack of fields in the region.  Many of the fields are concrete pitches on the properties of local families in the region.

Notable people
For mayors of Charters Towers, see City of Charters Towers#Mayors.

 Margaret Theadora Allan (1889–1968), community worker
 Cecil Aynsley, member of the Queensland rugby league team of the century
Bruce Barry (1934–2017), Australian actor and singer, grew up in the town
 Daisy Bates, Irish-Australian journalist and welfare worker, known for her work with indigenous Australians
 Adam Cook, Australian rugby league player
 Anderson Dawson, politician, 14th Premier of Queensland for one week, (1–7 December 1899), first Labor premier in Australia
 Dave Evans, first lead singer of AC/DC from 1973 to 1974
 William Edward Harney, Australian writer
 Wilhelm Iwan (1871–1958), author, historian, and theologian (lived in Charters Towers for nine years and wrote a book describing his experiences)
 Bob Katter, Australian politician
 Lieutenant Colonel Tom Mills MC & Bar (1908–1978), was born in Charters Towers
 Breaker Morant, Australian drover, horseman and soldier, spent some years in Charters Towers
 Hugh Mosman, pioneered gold mining in Charters Towers
 Jupiter Mosman, found the first gold in Charters Towers
 Major Hugh Quinn (1888–1915), Australian Soldier, namesake of Quinn's Post, frontline position ANZAC, Gallipoli
 Andrew Symonds, Australian Test cricketer, spent much of his early childhood in Charters Towers
 Edward Vivian Timms (1895–1960), novelist and scriptwriter
Olwen Wooster (1917–1981) Australian air force officer and pioneering telecommunications engineer.

See also

 Charters Towers Courthouse
 Charters Towers Excelsior Library

References

External links

 * 
Charters Towers City Council website

 
North Queensland
Charters Towers Region
Mining towns in Queensland
Mosman family